An election to Monaghan County Council took place on 23 May 2014 as part of that year's Irish local elections. 18 councillors were elected from three electoral divisions by PR-STV voting for a five-year term of office, a reduction of 2 seats compared to 2009. Monaghan also saw a further reduction in elected representation as Ballybay Town Council, Carrickmacross Town Council, Castleblayney Town Council, Clones Town Council and Monaghan Town Council were all abolished.

New Electoral Areas were introduced in 2013 and came into effect on 1 January 2014. The election in Ballybay-Clones local electoral area was disrupted when Fine Gael Councillor Owen Bannigan died suddenly while out canvassing on polling day. The election for this area was cancelled and all the ballots cast were officially destroyed. He had been expected to top the poll. It was re-run on 7 June 2014. The election in the other two electoral areas of Carrickmacross-Castleblayney and Monaghan went ahead.

Demonstrating their organisational strength within the county Sinn Féin emerged as the largest party after the elections with 7 seats, winning all the seats that the party contested. Fine Gael lost a seat in the Carrickmacross-Castleblayney LEA while Fianna Fáil lost a seat in Ballybay-Clones. Independents retained their 2 seats on the Council.

Results by party

Results by Electoral Area

Ballybay-Clones

Carrickmacross-Castleblayney

Monaghan

References

Changes Since 2014
† Carrickmacross-Castleblayney Sinn Féin Cllr Matt Carty was also elected as an MEP on 23 May 2014. Accordingly he resigned his Council seat in accordance with the Dual Mandate. His brother, Colm, was co-opted to fill the vacancy on 8 July 2014. 
†† Ballybay-Clones Fine Gael Cllr Hugh McElvaney resigned from Fine Gael and became an Independent following an RTE Investigation into payments to Councillors.
††† Ballybay-Clones Fine Gael Cllr Eugene Bannigan resigned to pursue a job opportunity in the United States. Seán Gilliland was co-opted to fill the vacancy on 7 December 2015.
†††† Monaghan Fianna Fáil Cllr Robbie Gallagher was elected to Seanad Eireann in April 2016. Raymond Aughey was co-opted to fill the vacancy on 4 July 2016.
††††† Ballybay-Clones Fine Gael Cllr Ciara McPhillips resigned her seat citing time constraints on 12 June 2017. Eva Humphreys was co-opted to fill the vacancy in October 2017. Eva resigned from the Council in October 2018 citing work pressures. Richard Truell was co-opted to replace her in December 2018.

External links
 Official website

2014 Irish local elections
Monaghan County Council elections